Saint John's School of Ontario (SJSO) was the third of three private Anglican boys' boarding schools in Toronto founded on conservative Anglican ideas and the notion that children were not challenged by present-day society. The two other defunct schools are Saint John's Cathedral Boys' School (Winnipeg), and Saint John's School of Alberta (closed 2008). The school's program included academics, outdoor education, and chores. Corporal punishment, in the form of hard paddlings delivered to the student's buttocks, was frequently administered at all three schools.

The school, founded in 1977, is best known for the canoeing disaster on Lake Timiskaming on 11 June 1978, where 12 children and 1 volunteer died of hypothermia, after their canoes capsized.  Inexperience and poor planning were blamed for the accident according to  books written by James Raffan and Scott Sorenson about the disaster.  Despite the tragedy and probable liability, none of the parents of the deceased took legal action against the school.  The parents' understanding of the accident contrasts with that put forward in Raffan's book that it was simply a terrible accident and that their sons had been the beneficiaries of good education and experiences, except for the canoeing deaths, would have been considered positively.

The school continued to operate for several years but suffered a fire and a serious car accident in which the headmaster, Frank Felletti, was injured and disabled. In the end, insufficient operating funds were the cause of the school's closure in 1989.  In the summer of 2007, alumni from the three St. John's schools gathered for a reunion in Ontario. School alumni have created a Facebook group.

References

External links
 
  

High schools in Toronto
Middle schools in Toronto
Private schools in Toronto
Anglican schools in Canada
Canoeing deaths
Educational institutions established in 1977
Educational institutions disestablished in 1989
1977 establishments in Ontario
1989 disestablishments in Ontario